Hangzhou No. 2 Telecom Hub is a 41-floor 248 metre (814 foot) tall skyscraper completed in 2003 located in Hangzhou, China.

See also
 List of tallest buildings in the world

External links

Skyscrapers in Hangzhou
Buildings and structures completed in 2003
2003 establishments in China
Skyscraper office buildings in China